ACM Transactions on Algorithms (TALG) is a quarterly peer-reviewed scientific journal covering the field of algorithms. It was established in 2005 and is published by the Association for Computing Machinery. The editor-in-chief is Edith Cohen. The journal was created when the editorial board of the Journal of Algorithms resigned out of protest to the pricing policies of the publisher, Elsevier. Apart from regular submissions, the journal also invites selected papers from the  ACM-SIAM Symposium on Discrete Algorithms (SODA).

Abstracting and indexing
The journal is abstracted and indexed in the Science Citation Index Expanded, Current Contents/Engineering, Computing & Technology, and Scopus. According to the Journal Citation Reports, the journal has a 2020 impact factor of 1.104.

Past editors 
The following persons have been editors-in-chief of the journal: 
 Harold N. Gabow (2005-2008)
 Susanne Albers (2008-2014)
 Aravind Srinivasan (2014-2021)

See also 
Algorithmica
Algorithms (journal)

References

External links
 

Association for Computing Machinery academic journals
Quarterly journals
Publications established in 2005
English-language journals
Computer science journals